Menegazzia caliginosa is a species of foliose lichen from New Zealand, Australia and South America.

See also
List of Menegazzia species

References

caliginosa
Lichen species
Lichens described in 1983
Lichens of Australia
Lichens of New Zealand
Lichens of South America
Taxa named by David Galloway (botanist)
Taxa named by Peter Wilfred James